John Meyer (born 13 August 1942 in Bloemfontein South Africa) is a South African painter.

He has exhibited extensively in South African and abroad specialising in landscapes and portraits (including portraits of Nobel laureates Nelson Mandela and FW De Klerk and concert pianist Vladimir Horowitz) in a photo-realist style. More recently he describes his work as falling into what he terms a "narrative genre" where paintings are often part of a series (usually three to six) of chronological scenes.

He has exhibited at the Slater Memorial Museum (Connecticut) and the Everard Read Gallery (Johannesburg).

References

External links
Official site
Biography, Everard Read Gallery Cape Town

1942 births
South African painters
South African male painters
Living people